Müritz is a former Kreis (district) in the southern part of Mecklenburg-Vorpommern, Germany. It is named after the lake Müritz. Neighboring districts were (from the west clockwise) Parchim, Güstrow, Demmin, Mecklenburg-Strelitz, the district-free city Neubrandenburg and the district Ostprignitz-Ruppin in Brandenburg. The district was disbanded at the district reform of September 2011. Its territory has been part of the Mecklenburgische Seenplatte district since.

Geography
The district of Müritz constituted roughly the western half of the Müritz lakeland and the Müritz National Park. The lake Müritz has an area of 117 km2; it is the second largest lake of Germany after Lake Constance, and the largest lake entirely within the German borders.

History
Müritz District was established on June 12, 1994, by merging the previous districts of Röbel and Waren; along with a few municipalities from the districts of Malchin and Neustrelitz. This district was merged with the district of Mecklenburg-Strelitz and most of the district of Demmin at the district reform of September 2011, forming the new Mecklenburgische Seenplatte district.

Coat of arms

Towns and municipalities
The subdivisions of the district were (situation August 2011):

References

External links

Official website (German)

Former districts of Mecklenburg-Western Pomerania